Ball Play or Ballplay may refer to:

Ballplay, Alabama
Ballplay, Monroe County, Tennessee
Ball Play, Polk County, Tennessee
Ball Play Creek, in Georgia, US
The Ball (play), a comedy by James Shirley, first performed in 1632